The Nijkerk–Ede-Wageningen railway is a railway line in the Netherlands currently running from Barneveld to Ede-Wageningen. The part between Nijkerk and Barneveld has been demolished. It was previously nicknamed the Kippenlijn ("chicken line") in Dutch, but since 2006, it's nicknamed Valleilijn ("valley line") by its operator (Connexxion).

The line

The Valleilijn is a single track line with passing loops at Barneveld Centrum and Lunteren. It runs through the valley where there are many chicken farms and was therefore originally called the Kippenlijn until a project was launched on 10 December 2006.

The line has interchanges with other railway services at Amersfoort and Ede-Wageningen.

History
The line opened on 1 May 1902 as the Kippenlijn from Nijkerk to Ede. The line between Nijkerk and Barneveld Noord closed in 1937 and the whole line was shut on 7 September 1944 because of World War II.

The line re-opened on 20 May 1951 and was electrified for that date as well. The line operates as the Oosterspoorweg between Amersfoort and the Barneveld Noord junction. From there the line is 17 km long and takes 20 minutes to operate from Barneveld Noord to Ede-Wageningen.

Stations
The following stations are on or serviced by the Valleilijn (Hoevelaken is technically situated on the Oosterspoorweg), including some possible interchanges:

Previous stations

Driedorp, Appel, Dusschoten, Voorthuizen, Barneveld Kruispunt, Meulunteren, Doesburgerbuurt, Stompekamp and Ede Gemeentehuis.

2006 Service improvements
Before 10 December 2006, the line was operated by Nederlandse Spoorwegen but on that date, Connexxion took over the service and made a lot of improvements.

Train
5 new Protos train sets were placed into service, to improve comfort on the line. 2 Stadler FLIRT 3 train sets were also put into service in 2018.

Buses
From 10 December 2006 Syntus, also relaunched the bus service 88 (Ede - Wageningen). A fleet of brand new buses were placed into service in the same Valleilijn livery. This service operates up to every 10 minutes.

Passengers can connect with the train from/to Amersfoort.

From 10 December, 2020 introduced a new name rrreis instead of the "Valleilijn" brand. 

From 12 December, 2022 transdev took over the rrreis bus services due to the company being accused of fraudulent activities. Due to low state funding most of these buses are old bravo, r-net & connexxion buses.

Train services

Gallery

References

Railway lines in the Netherlands